Edurne, full name Edurne García Almagro (born 1985) is a Spanish singer, actress, and TV presenter.

Edurne may also refer to:

Edurne Ganem, known professionally as Edy Ganem, Mexican-Lebanese actress
Edurne Pasaban (born 1973), Basque Spanish mountaineer
Edurne, debut album of the singer Edurne